De Viaje ("Traveling") is the second studio album from Sin Bandera. It was released on October 21, 2003. The album earned the band their second Latin Grammy Award for Best Pop Album by a Duo or Group with Vocals on September 1, 2004.

Track listing

 De Viaje
 Amor Real
 Ven
 ABC
 Contigo
 Magia
 Bien
 Que Lloro
 Canción Para Los Días Lluviosos
 Mientes Tan Bien
 Puede Ser (feat. Presuntos Implicados)
 Aquí
 Te Esperaré (Intro)
 Te Esperaré
 Suficiente
 Tal Vez

Sales and certifications

References

2003 albums
Sin Bandera albums
Latin Grammy Award for Best Pop Album by a Duo or Group with Vocals